Carlow Mayo is a township in northern Hastings County in Eastern Ontario, Canada. It was formed in 2001 by the amalgamation of the townships of Carlow and Mayo.

Historically, the economy in the area was based on timber and mining. The Little Mississippi River and York River were used to transport logs out of the forests. Now, tourism is an important part of the local economy. Over half of the land in the region is designated crown land.

Carlow and Mayo were named after the counties of the same name in Ireland (County Carlow and County Mayo).

Communities within the municipal boundaries include: Bessemer, Boulter, Childs Mines, Craigmont, Fort Stewart, Hartsmere, Havergal, Hermon, McArthur Mills, New Carlow, and Rowland.

Demographics 

Mother tongue:
 English as first language: 94.7%
 French as first language: 3.7%
 English and French as first language: 0%
 Other as first language: 1.6%

See also
List of townships in Ontario

References

External links 

Lower-tier municipalities in Ontario
Municipalities in Hastings County
Township municipalities in Ontario